Manaia Salavea (born 26 March 1986) is a Samoan rugby union rugbyman. He currently plays for French team Narbonne and the Samoan rugby union, and usually plays as a flanker. 
He was part of the Samoan team at the 2011 Rugby World Cup where he played in two matches, he made his international debut in 2010.

References

External links

1986 births
Living people
Samoan rugby union players
Samoa international rugby union players
Samoan expatriate rugby union players
Expatriate rugby union players in France
Samoan expatriate sportspeople in France
Rugby union flankers